Live in the Navajo Nation is an Alanis Morissette DVD/VHS released in 2002 (see 2002 in music). It is part of the Music in High Places series and was recorded in October 2000 in Arizona, United States.

Track listing
"Baba"
"That I Would Be Good"
"No Pressure over Cappuccino"
"UR"
"Heart of the House"
"Your House"
"I Was Hoping"
"Uninvited"
"Ironic"

Alanis Morissette video albums
2002 video albums
Live video albums
2002 live albums